Women in Aviation International (WAI) is an American nonprofit organization, which provides networking, education, mentoring, and scholarship opportunities for women and men in careers in the aviation and aerospace industries. It aims to promote public understanding of notable American women in the aviation industry.

About 
WAI has resources for members who include astronauts, pilots, flight attendants, maintenance technicians, air traffic controllers, educators, students, air show performers, airport managers, business owners, and many others. The group emphasizes helping members find employment and build their careers. Membership in WAI is composed of aviation professionals, enthusiasts, students and corporate members. Local chapters work to help break cultural stereotypes about gender and aviation careers. The organization is based in West Alexandria, Ohio. 

WAI publishes a magazine called Aviation for Women which has six issues per year. WAI also sponsors scholarships for members of WAI.

History 
Dean of academic support at  Embry-Riddle Aeronautical University, Peggy Baty Chabrian, had experienced problems recruiting and retaining female aviation students. In order to attract more women, she suggested creating a seminar and invited Moya Lear, Jeana Yeager, Shannon Lucid and Bobbi Trout to speak at the first annual conference in 1990. Women responded well to the conference, and an informal organization was created.

WAI was incorporated in 1994. As the founder of the WAI Conference,  Chabrian was named the first full-time president and CEO of the organization in 1996 by the board of directors. By 1998, the group had 3,000 members.

WAI sponsored the first Arab Women in Aviation show at the Dubai International Convention Center in May of 2016.

Annual conference 

Each year the organization hosts an annual conference, which has grow  from 150 participants in 1990 to  approximately 4,500 in 2015. In 1996, there were 1,400 women attending the conference. In 2013, there were more than 3,000 attendees. Men constituted the majority of attendees in 2016, a trend noted at previous conferences.

The conference includes educational workshops, networking opportunities with various aspects of the aviation industry, a scholarship awards banquet, and the annual WAI Pioneer Hall of Fame Induction Ceremony. Approximately a half million dollars in scholarship money was being awarded by 2004. A portion of the scholarships are awarded to men.

In 1996, Robin Lamar and Marcia Buckingham sponsored an organizational meeting for aviation and mechanics at the WAI annual conference, leading to the formation of a new group, called the Association for Women in Aviation Maintenance.

Girls in Aviation Day 
In 2015, WAI launched Girls in Aviation Day  observed on last Saturday of the month of September. The day is intended to interest girls, ages 8 to 17, in aviation careers. A Girl Scout patch was designed for the 2016 Girls in Aviation Day which would be given out to scouts who took part in the day's activities.

Hall of Fame 

The Women in Aviation International Pioneer Hall of Fame was established in 1992. Its purpose is to honor women who make significant contributions as record setters, pioneers, or innovators in the aviation and aerospace industries. WAI solicits nominations from throughout the aviation industry each year for the WAI Pioneer Hall of Fame. Inductees are chosen from the nominations by a committee, "with special consideration given to individuals who have helped other women become successful in aviation or opened doors of opportunity for other women."

References

Citations

Sources

External links 
Women in Aviation International webpage

Aviation-related professional associations
Organizations established in 1990
Preble County, Ohio
Non-profit organizations based in Ohio
Women's organizations based in the United States
Women's occupational organizations
Women aviators